In telecommunication, the term code conversion has the following meanings: 

1.  Conversion of signals, or groups of signals, in one code into corresponding signals, or groups of signals, in another code.  

2.  A process for converting a code of some predetermined bit structure, such as 5, 7, or 14 bits per character interval, to another code with the same or a different number of bits per character interval. 

In code conversion, alphabetical order is not significant.

References

Line codes